During the campaigns of 1916-1919, Romanian airmen achieved about 10,000 flight hours, had about 700 aerial fights and shot down some 51-91 enemy aircraft, including observation  balloons.

World War I Romanian aces

During the First World War, 4 airmen of the Romanian Air Corps earned more than 5 victories. However, by Romanian air victory standards (no shared victories counted), only one of them was considered an ace, Dumitru Bădulescu. As an air observer, he only shared victories with his pilot. 

The following list includes all Romanian airmen who have achieved 5 or more victories, including shared and unconfirmed ones.

World War I Romanian airmen who achieved at least 1 victory
The following list includes all Romanian airmen who achieved at least 1 victory, including shared, unconfirmed and those achieved in 1919.

Other World War I aces born on the territory of modern-day Romania
Two other aces of the war were born on the territory of present-day Romania. Both serving in the K.u.K. Luftfahrtruppen.

See also
 Lists of World War I flying aces

Notes

References

Romania
Aviation history of Romania
Romania in World War I